WVKX (103.7 FM) is a radio station broadcasting an Urban Contemporary format. Licensed to Irwinton, Georgia, United States.  The station is currently owned by Wilkinson Broadcasting, Inc.

History
The station went on the air as WYSI on 1989-02-10.  on 1991-02-08, the station changed its call sign to the current WVKX.

References

External links

VKX
Urban contemporary radio stations in the United States